"Prince Andrew & the Epstein Scandal" is an episode of the BBC's news and current affairs programme Newsnight broadcast on BBC Two on 16 November 2019. In the 58-minute programme, Prince Andrew, Duke of York was interviewed by Emily Maitlis about his relationship with the American convicted sex offender Jeffrey Epstein. Andrew's responses in the interview received negative reactions from both the media and the public. In May 2020, it was announced that he would indefinitely withdraw from his public roles.

Background 
In March 2011, BBC News reported that the friendship of Prince Andrew, Duke of York, with American financier and convicted sex offender Jeffrey Epstein was producing "a steady stream of criticism", with calls for him to step down from his role as trade envoy. The Duke was also criticised in the media after his ex-wife Sarah Ferguson disclosed that he helped arrange for Epstein to pay off £15,000 of her debts. He had been photographed in December 2010 strolling with Epstein in Central Park during a visit to New York City. In July 2011, the Duke's role as trade envoy was terminated and he reportedly cut all ties with Epstein.

On 30 December 2014, a Florida court filing by lawyers Bradley J. Edwards and Paul G. Cassell alleged that Prince Andrew was one of several prominent figures to have participated in sexual activities with a minor later identified as Virginia Giuffre, who was allegedly trafficked for sex by Epstein. Giuffre (then known by her maiden name Virginia Roberts) asserted that she had sex with Andrew on three occasions, including a trip to London in 2001 when she was 17, and later in New York and on Little Saint James, U.S. Virgin Islands. She alleged Epstein paid her $15,000 to have sex with the Duke in London. Flight logs show the Duke and Giuffre were in the places she alleges the sex happened. Andrew and Giuffre were also photographed together with his arm round her waist, and an Epstein associate, Ghislaine Maxwell, standing in the background, though the Duke's supporters have repeatedly claimed the photo is fake and edited. Giuffre stated that she was pressured to have sex with Andrew and "wouldn't have dared object" as Epstein, through contacts, could have her "killed or abducted". A civil case filed by Giuffre against Prince Andrew was later settled for an undisclosed sum in February 2022.

In August 2019, court documents associated with a defamation case between Giuffre and Maxwell revealed that a second girl, Johanna Sjoberg, gave evidence alleging that Prince Andrew had placed his hand on her breast while in Epstein's mansion posing for a photo with his Spitting Image puppet. By the end of August 2019, The New Republic also published an email exchange between John Brockman and Evgeny Morozov from September 2013 in which Brockman mentions seeing a British man nicknamed "Andy" receiving a foot massage from two Russian women at Epstein's New York residence in September 2010. He then added that he realised "that the recipient of Irina's foot massage was His Royal Highness, Prince Andrew, the Duke of York".

Content 
In November 2019, the BBC's Newsnight arranged an interview between Prince Andrew and Emily Maitlis in which he publicly recounted his dealings with Epstein for the first time. The interview was recorded in Buckingham Palace on 14 November and broadcast on 16 November. Prince Andrew said that he met Epstein in 1999 through Maxwell; this version contradicts the account given by the Duke's private secretary in 2011, who said the two met in "the early 1990s". The Duke said he did not regret his friendship with Epstein, saying "the people that I met and the opportunities that I was given to learn either by him or because of him were actually very useful".

Prince Andrew denied having sex with Giuffre on 10 March 2001, as she had claimed, because (he said) he had been at home with his daughters after attending a party at PizzaExpress in Woking with his elder daughter, Princess Beatrice. The Duke said that he had "no recollection of ever meeting" Giuffre and that he had "absolutely no memory" of a photograph taken of him with Giuffre at Maxwell's residence in London. The Duke said he had investigations carried out to establish whether the photograph was faked, but they had been inconclusive. He also claimed that he had never been upstairs in Maxwell's house and questioned his attire, saying that the clothes he wore in the photograph were his "travelling clothes" that he did not wear while in the country.

Prince Andrew also added that Giuffre's claims about dancing with him at Tramp while he was sweaty were false, due to him temporarily losing the ability to sweat after an "adrenaline overdose" during the Falklands War. "Several doctors" told The Times they did not believe this explanation, as adrenaline overdose typically causes excessive sweating in humans.  It has been previously said that his mother the Queen has not been seen sweating in public, raising the possibility of inherited anhidrosis (although this was not the explanation given by the Duke).

Prince Andrew admitted to staying in Epstein's mansion for three days in 2010, after Epstein's conviction for sex offences against a minor, describing the location as "a convenient place to stay". However, he said, "I kick myself on a daily basis" for the decision "because it was not something that was becoming of a member of the royal family", adding that he "let the side down". The Duke said that he met Epstein for the sole purpose of breaking off any future relationship with him, saying that it was "the honourable and right thing to do", adding that one of his flaws was that he was "too honourable" a person. He also said that, if "push came to shove" (and after consultation with his legal teams), he would be willing to testify under oath regarding his associations with Epstein.

Aftermath 
Maitlis and Newsnight believed the interview was approved by the Queen, although "palace insiders" speaking to The Sunday Telegraph disputed this. One of Prince Andrew's official advisors resigned just before the interview was aired. Although the Duke himself was pleased with the outcome of the interview – reportedly giving Maitlis and the Newsnight team a tour of Buckingham Palace – it received negative reactions from both the media and the public, both in and outside the UK. The interview was described as a "car crash", "nuclear explosion level bad" and the worst public relations crisis for the royal family since the death of Diana, Princess of Wales.

Hannah Bardell, MP called the interview "sickening" and stated, "Prince Andrew literally has no remorse or regard for the women abused and clearly does not see the problem with being pals with Epstein[...] The systematic abuse of power is unbelievable." The Guardian wrote, "It was an exchange that summed up a grotesque mismatch between the Duke of York's language and demeanour, and the gravity of the allegations which continue to surround him; between the obtuse self-absorption of a prince and what we know of the appalling sexual exploitation of teenage girls by his friend."

On 20 November 2019, a statement from Buckingham Palace announced that Prince Andrew was suspending his public duties "for the foreseeable future". The decision, made with the consent of the Queen, was accompanied by insistence that the Duke sympathised with Epstein's victims. In the days following the interview, Andrew relinquished his role as chancellor of the University of Huddersfield. The accountancy firm KPMG announced it would not be renewing its sponsorship of Andrew's entrepreneurial scheme Pitch@Palace, and Standard Chartered also withdrew its support. The palace later confirmed that Andrew was to step down from all 230 of his patronages.

On 28 January 2020, US Attorney Geoffrey Berman stated that Prince Andrew had provided "zero co-operation" with federal prosecutors and the FBI regarding the ongoing investigations into Epstein, despite his initial promise in the Newsnight interview when he said he was willing to help the authorities. In April 2020, it was reported that the Duke of York Young Champions Trophy would not be played any more, after all activities carried out by the Prince Andrew Charitable Trust were stopped. It was revealed in the next month that the trust was under investigation by the Charity Commission regarding some regulatory issues about £350,000 of payments to his former private secretary Amanda Thirsk. According to The Times, senior personnel in the British Army and Royal Navy considered Andrew to be an embarrassment to the military and believed he should be stripped of his military roles. Newsweek reported that a majority of British citizens believed Andrew should be stripped of his titles and extradited to the United States.

In May 2020, it was announced that Prince Andrew would permanently resign from all his public roles over his Epstein ties.

In 2021, Sigrid McCawley, one of Virginia Giuffre's lawyers, said that she believed the interview would strengthen the case against Andrew in legal action Giuffre was taking against him. McCawley stated that the interview would be part of the case against Andrew. The Kunts published a song ridiculing Andrew's claim that he cannot sweat, and his claim that he was at Pizza Express Woking with the title "Prince Andrew Is a Sweaty Nonce".

Awards 
Maitlis won the Network Presenter of the Year award at the RTS Television Journalism Awards in 2020, while the interview was awarded as the Interview of the Year and the Scoop of the Year. The episode was also nominated in the news coverage category at the 2020 British Academy Television Awards.

In popular culture 
In July 2022 it was announced that a film would be made of the preparations for the interview and the interview itself. Shooting was planned to start in November 2022. According to Deadline, Scoop is being written by Peter Moffat, and will be directed by Philip Martin.

References

Further reading

External links 
 
 
 BBC News - Transcript of the interview
 

2019 British television episodes
2019 controversies
BBC television documentaries
BBC Two
British Royal interviews
Jeffrey Epstein
Royal scandals
Television controversies in the United Kingdom
Prince Andrew, Duke of York